The Hungarian Heritage Award is a distinction awarded to Hungarian institutions or persons who have contributed to activities of Hungarian culture, economy, sports or science, to ensure the spiritual uplift of Hungarian society. The award was established in 1995.

The Hungarian Heritage and Europe Association (Magyar Örökség és Európa Egyesület) took over the award in March 2003 from The Foundation for Hungary (Magyarországért Alapítvány).

Recipients 
 Miklós Bánffy, writer – 2001
 Franz Liszt Academy of Music – 2007
Endre Fülei-Szántó – 2005
 József Marek, veterinary scientist – 2007
 László Rédei, mathematician – 2007
 Albert Wass

References

Hungarian awards
Awards established in 1995